The 2003 Pan American Games, officially known as the XIV Pan American Games, were a continental multi-sport event held in Santo Domingo, Dominican Republic, from August 1 to August 17, 2003. At the Games, 5,500 athletes selected from 42 National Olympic Committees (NOCs) participated in events in 35 sports. Thirty-one nations earned medals during the competition, and sixteen won at least one gold medal.

Medal table 
The ranking in this table is based on medal counts published by several media organizations. By default, the table is ordered by the number of gold medals won by the athletes representing a nation. (In this context, a nation is an entity represented by a NOC). The number of silver medals is taken into consideration next and then the number of bronze medals. If nations are still tied, equal ranking is given and they are listed alphabetically by IOC country code.

To sort this table by nation, total medal count, or any other column, click on the  icon next to the column title.

References 
General

 

Specific

Medal table
Pan American Games medal tables